The ) was a powerful magnitude 6.6 earthquake that occurred 10:13 local time (01:13 UTC) on July 16, 2007, in the northwest Niigata region of Japan. The earthquake, which occurred at a previously unknown offshore fault shook Niigata and neighbouring prefectures. The city of Kashiwazaki and the villages of Iizuna and Kariwa registered the highest seismic intensity of a strong 6 on Japan's shindo scale, and the quake was felt as far away as Tokyo. Eleven deaths and at least 1,000 injuries were reported, and 342 buildings were completely destroyed, mostly older wooden structures. Prime Minister Shinzō Abe broke off from his election campaign to visit Kashiwazaki and promised to "make every effort towards rescue and also to restore services such as gas and electricity".

Tectonic summary

At this latitude, the Okhotsk Plate is converging to the west-northwest towards the Amur Plate with a velocity of about 9 mm/yr and a maximum convergence rate of 24 mm/yr. The Amur and Okhotsk plates are themselves relatively small plates that lie between the Eurasian Plate and the Pacific Plate. The Pacific Plate converges west-northwest towards the Eurasia Plate at over 90 mm/yr.

The two earthquakes were generated by different mechanisms. The first earthquake was caused by deformation within the crust of the Okhotsk Plate and the second quake was likely caused by faulting resulting from internal deformation of the subducted Pacific Plate. Given their different mechanisms and physical separation of at least 10 rupture lengths, the second earthquake is not considered an aftershock of the first.

Shallow earthquakes cause more damage than intermediate- and deep-focus ones since the energy generated by the shallow events is released closer to the surface and therefore produces stronger shaking than is produced by quakes that are deeper within the Earth. The peak ground acceleration generated was 993 gal (1.01 g).

Two days after the initial earthquake, an aftershock, registering 4 shindo, occurred in Izumozaki, Niigata.

Intensity

Automotive production
On July 18, Toyota motor announced it stopped production in all of its factories because of the damage done to the Riken parts plant in Kashiwazaki, Niigata.  Nissan also had to shut down two factories. Production resumed in Toyota, Mazda, and Honda plants on July 25, after damaged equipment and gas and water supplies were restored. Toyota's production losses amounted to between 46,000 or possibly 55,000 vehicles. Nissan lost 12,000 vehicles.

Kashiwazaki-Kariwa Nuclear Power Plant incidents

The earthquake caused a leak of radioactive gases from Kashiwazaki-Kariwa Nuclear Power Plant. A small amount of water from the spent fuel pool leaked out but plant operators said the leak was insignificant and did not present any environmental danger. The earthquake also caused a fire in an electrical transformer at the plant that was extinguished after two hours.

The government requested that the plant remain closed pending safety inspections. The International Atomic Energy Agency offered to send a team of experts to inspect the plant.  The Japanese government initially declined the offer but later accepted it after Niigata Prefecture legislature asked for confidence building efforts to counter public concern about the reactor. Following the incident Dr Kiyoo Mogi, chair of Japan's Coordinating Committee for Earthquake Prediction, called for the immediate closure of the Hamaoka Nuclear Power Plant, which was built close to the centre of the expected Tōkai earthquake.

See also

 List of earthquakes in 2007
 List of earthquakes in Japan

Sources

External links

Earthquakes of the Heisei period
Chuetsu Earthquake, 2007
History of Niigata Prefecture
Chuetsu earthquake
July 2007 events in Japan
Niigata Prefecture
2007 disasters in Japan